Vugar Aliyev (born 19 January 1974) is an Azerbaijani volleyball coach who currently manages Murov VC in  Azerbaijan Women's Volleyball Super League. He was the head coach of Azerbaijan national team at the 2021 Women's European Volleyball Championship.

External links
CEV profile
Volleybox profile

1974 births
Living people
Azerbaijani men's volleyball players
Volleyball coaches